Chordonota is a genus of flies in the family Stratiomyidae.

Species
Chordonota aterrima James, 1940
Chordonota flavitarsis (Enderlein, 1914)
Chordonota fuscipennis Bellardi, 1862
Chordonota inermis (Wiedemann, 1830)
Chordonota leiophthalma Williston, 1896
Chordonota nigra Williston, 1888
Chordonota vittata (Wulp, 1881)

References

Stratiomyidae
Brachycera genera
Taxa named by Carl Eduard Adolph Gerstaecker
Diptera of South America